Desislava Ivanova Doneva (born 7 March 1979), known by her stage names Desi Slava or DESS, is a Bulgarian singer-songwriter and producer. She was born in Radnevo, Bulgaria. Her first stage appearances began at an early age, when she would win awards at festivals for children. Shortly afterwards, she became the soloist of "Radnevo" orchestra. This led to her being noticed by one of the most famous Bulgarian folklore singers of all time – Valkana Stoyanova, who took her under her wing, coached her and declared Desislava as her possible music heir.

Career

When she was 18 years old, the biggest music company in Bulgaria Payner Music offered her a contract and she released her first studio album 'I Got No Problems' (Нямам проблеми), in which she wrote/co-wrote 5 out of the 11 songs. The following year she released her second studio album Ези-Тура (Heads  or Tails), which gained critical acclaim and performed great in sales, reaching golden status. Her third studio album Завинаги (Forever) released in 2003, was received very well by media and public. The album produced the hit-single Beli Noshti (White nights), which became a super hit in the country and one of her most famous songs to date. In 2002 Doneva released Мистерия (Mystery), after spending a year in the U.S. The new album surprised media and fans, presenting Desislava in a new light - both musically and appearance-wise.

In 2003, she announced she has left "Payner Music", citing she felt limited in her musical and creative freedom by the company. In early 2004, she founded her own company New Music Stars and released Любовта е само чувство (Love is just a feeling). The album featured songs in different genres - pop-folk, dance, r&b, hip-hop and ragga.

In 2004, she released two albums — The Best of Desi Slava and the duet album Together — with Azis. In 2005, she released Гореща следа (A Hot mark), producing pop, dance, Latin songs in Bulgarian, English and Spanish.

In 2006, she released the album Сладки сънища (Sweet dreams). One of her bests according to critics.: The songs on the album presented diverse music styles - folk, pop, R & B, reggaeton, rock songs in Bulgarian, Spanish and English.

In 2007, Desislava was in the center of a huge media interest: she appeared on the cover of FHM Bulgaria magazine, and took part in Big Brother VIP edition. She toured with The Comedians on a national tour, where she participated with singing and acting in some of the comedy acts along her actor co-stars, showing a different side to her artistry. Desi Slava was the first star to be invited to MAD SECRET CONCERT, where she performed cover songs of Sade, Lenny Kravitz, Christina Aguilera, Michael Jackson, Tina Turner, Aerosmit, Madonna, Rolling Stones, Bee Gees, Alannah Myles, Belinda Carlslile, Kylie Minogue, etc.

In 2007, Desi Slava fulfilled one of her dreams, releasing an unofficial Spanish-language album Estoy aqui. For two years, along with other projects, she prepared songs in Spanish, mostly in the pop style and with a slight Caribbean and reggae influence. Before the album was finished, it mysteriously leaked on the internet, leading her to make a decision not to release it. However, some of the songs became internet hits.

In 2009, the album Послушай сърцето си (Listen to your heart) was released and it was well received by the critics and musicians - it relied not on a commercial sound, but on a deeper emotion. In the same year, Single Agapi Mou / Loving you, (DesiSlava ft. Kostas Martakis) – dance-pop duet, created by "Symphonics" and produced by Desislava. In Greece, the song was officially released in the album of Kostas Pio konta, published by Universal Music Greece.

From 2009 to 2010, Desislava produced two young talents – Dzhemile (pop-folk, Balkan music, and folklore) and Nadia (pop, R&B, dance, soul).

In 2010 Desislava launched her own independent music TV channel, called DSTV, giving new Bulgarian artists the opportunity to show their music. A year and a half later, in June 2011, she sold the television channel, in order to focus more on her music career.

In 2011, the single Калино моме (Boy George, Marc Vedo ft. DesiSlava) was released with music written by Boy George, lyrics and vocals by Desislava and arrangement by DJ Marc Vedo.

In 2011, an experimental album Slavatronica was released - a combination of electronic music and folklore. The core of this band were the musicians from London – Vancho Manoilovich and Matt Cooper from "Incognito" and the Bulgarian musicians Vladimir Velichkov from "Kanarite", Atanas Slavov – Mravcho and Turaman. The album was distributed only electronically – on Amazon, Spotify, MySpace, Medianet, eMusic, Nokia and others ...

In the same year, Desi started close cooperation with Romanian team, which resulted in her single "I like". Consequently, she decided to change her name for the dance projects to DESS. I like  was a summer hit, taking all first places in pop charts. This provided DESS with recognition by her colleagues from the pop industry.

In 2012, the song through which Desislava appeared on the Bulgarian Eurovision was released. In the semi-final, Dess was selected as number 1 by a jury and audience. At the final, she remained second. The music of Love is alive was made by herself and her colleagues from "SYMPHONICS" Borislav Milanov and Sebastian Arman, and the text is again by Borislav Milanov.

In the same year, she and Toni Storaro officially presented their new duet Не искам без теб (I do not want without you)

In the same year, she released her second single under the pseudonym Dess "Only one". The song was the work of the Romanian DJ Matias Endoor. The video was made by director Stanislav Hristov and was amongst the most popular summer videos. After Only one Desislava became the only singer nominated for pop folk awards (Nov folk) and pop awards (BG Radio).

In the same year, Desislava won the prestigious "Radnevo Award" for 2012. The Mayor Dr. Julian Iltchev gave the award at a ceremony on the Day of the city. The award is given to individuals who have made a real and significant contribution to the development and prosperity of the city Radnevo.

In the same year, she released her first duet song "It ain't over" with the talented model, singer and composer Alek Sandar. The video was shot in Berlin, and the song was the beginning of joint projects between Dess and Alek Sandar.

In 2013, Baby – the pop single created by Alek Sandar and Boyplay. Desislava presented the song at a charity concert and several months later she gave the song to be an anthem of Sofia Pride 2013. In the same year, Desislava went to Tirana, Albania to meet Alfred Sula – the best Albanian composer. She bought a song from him – Play it again. Desislava was proud of the song because it became the summer pop folk hit. On her birthday she released her new song Усещам (I feel). In the song take part the best pontic-lira musician – the famous Greek Mako.

In the same year, Alek Sandar's song with her "You and me". There is a Bulgarian version called Az I ti.

In beginning of 2014, Desislava released her song Моето зайче (My bunny). The video was made in The Seychelles Islands where the singer had been on a vacation.

In July 2014, the singer was chosen to be a coach in the third season of the reality talent show "The Voice of Bulgaria" on bTV. The winner of the reality show was Kristina Ivanova, who was a singer in her team. Desislava caused great admiration with her natural reactions, with her powerful rock'n'roll, the implementation of "Зайди, зайди" and the dedicated work with her team of artists.

In the same year, she released her duet featuring German rapper Nana Cotton Candy.

On 20 November 2014, Desi Slava signed a contract with Payner Music and was presented at the concert "13 years Planeta TV" on 1 December. Her live singing and brilliant vision were the cause of much applause and nice comments of a great return in the largest music company in Bulgaria.

In 2015, she released her first song after returning to Payner — Не го прави (Don't do it) In the same year, she released song and music video В твоите очи (In your eyes), feauting Galena. On 11 June 25 years of Payner, together with Galena, Preslava, Emilia, Anelia, and Tsvetelina Yaneva, present a new version of the popular song Лале ли си, зюмбюл ли си (You Are a Tulip, You are a Zymboul). A month later, on 9 July, a video of the Dobrudja folk song was released. In the summer, the singer presents the song Започваме на чисто (We Begin Clean). At the beginning of September, the singer took part in Konstantin's song От утре ще е друго (Tomorrow Will Be Another). On 12 December, the last song of the singer of the year goes to the song Смени паролата си (Change Your Password). Desi Slava enters the house of Big Brother All Stars and comes out the winner.

In the beginning of 2016, she released ballade song В друг живот (In Another life. In the autumn of 2016 she released И на всички като тебе (And to everyone like you) which became a superhit. At the end of the year, Desi Slava presented the ballad И това ще преживея (And I'll Survive).

On 27 February 2017, the singer was among the participants in the fifth season of the Imitation Show Като две капки вода, where she reached the finals and finished second.

She has been in a relationship with the Bulgarian boxer Blagoy Naydenov, who is around 15 years younger than her, since 2016. They have one son, Boris (b. 28 December 2017). Desi Slava also has a son, Mayki (b. 22 July 2000) from a previous relationship.

Awards and achievements 
Major international events:

– 2007 – Desislava was the first Bulgarian singer to give a concert at London's prestigious Jazz Club "Soho Revue". The show was titled "Cabaret Desislava" and on the stage with her were Vanco Manojlovic (played with Pink Floyd and The Who) and Matt Cooper of "Инкогнито"

– 2008 – MAD Video Music Awards 2008 in Greece. Desislava was the first Bulgarian singer who sang on stage at the Mad Video Music Awards. She sang alongside Greek sex symbol Kostas Martakis.

– 2008 her single "Never end" – a dance single, released by Universal Music Spain in the best-selling dance summer compilation – Disco Estrella. Also in 2008, she participated in "Let’s Duet" – a reality show where she had the opportunity to show the audience her amazing performances across genres: Bulgarian folklore, Macedonian songs, disco, rock, metal, r & b, opera, movie music, folk, Greek, Bulgarian and Russian traditional songs.

– 2009  her single "My Pleasure, My Pain" – Recorded and produced in London by producer John Themis (worked with Spice Girls, Shugarbabes, Rod Stewart, Boy George, Kylie Minogue, George Michael, etc.), who was also the author of the song. The style of the ballad is a British rock. "My Pleasure, My Pain" was broadcast on MTV.

– 2010 – When the great Turkish pop star Mustafa Sandal was in Bulgaria, he chose to invite Desislava to sing with him in his concert in Bulgaria.

– 2012 – Desislava was the only performer from Bulgaria, invited to sing at the most prestigious Balkan Awards – Media Music Awards. There, she performed on the same stage as the best Romanian stars.

Movie appearances:

– 2005 – Desislava’s song “Лъжа” /"Lie"/ became part of the soundtrack and the plot of the Bulgarian film "Lady Z", which received many Balkan awards.

– 2010 – the French television channel "M6" made a documentary about the phenomenon "pop folk" and devoted a great part of it to Desislava.

– 2011 – Desislava took part in the Bulgarian sound of 3D "Rio" for 20th Century Fox.

– 2011 – She had a major role in the film "Small – Large", directed by Yassen Grigorov, in partnership with the great photographer Temelko Temelkov. The film was awarded with a "Golden Rose".

– 2012 – She had a major role in the TV series "Столичани в повече”

Others:

– 2007/2009 – Desislava was the commercial face of the world's largest internet bookmaker Sportingbet. When she signed a contract with "Sportingbet" in 2007, the company's website was blocked for a short period because of a poker game with Desislava, which caused unprecedented interest.
– 2010 – Desislava was the only pop folk singer in Bulgaria who was invited to sing with Ruse’ Philharmonic Orchestra and Burgas’ Philharmonic Orchestra. At the end of the year, she was a part of a „FAN TV” tour, the purpose of which was to unite the pop and pop folk genre. The singer performed songs from both styles.
 
1994 First prize at the Folklore Festival "Slaveyche" Radio "Stara Zagora"

1995 First prize at the folk festival "Petko Zaharieva"

1996 Grand Prix of Folk Festival "Valkana Stoyanova"

1999 Award for live performance at the festival "Golden Mustang"

2000 Award of the "World Arts Festival" in Hollywood (USA) in the section on pop music
Award for the hit of the year – “Мъжете всичко искат” /"Men want everything"/
Award of the Audience at the festival "Trakia Folk" – “Бели нощи” /‘White Nights’/ 
Award of the Jury at the festival "Trakia Folk" – “Бели нощи” /‘White Nights’/ 
Annual awards of Hit Cocktail – Singer of the year
Annual awards of Hit Cocktail – “Ези Тура” – Album of the year
Annual awards of Hit Cocktail – “Мила моя, мили мой” Hit of the year
Annual awards of ‘Nov Folk’ magazine – “Ези Тура” – Album of the year
Annual awards of ‘Nov Folk’ magazine – Best hit singer of the year
Annual awards of ‘Nov Folk’ magazine – “Бели нощи” /‘White Nights’/ Song of the year

2002 The audience chart of ‘Planet TV’ – Singer of the year
Annual music awards of ‘Planet TV’ – Best singer
Annual awards of ‘Nov Folk’ magazine – Singer of the year
Annual awards of ‘Nov Folk’ magazine “Мистерия” /‘Mystery’/ – Album of the year
Annual awards of ‘Nov Folk’ magazine-“Две сърца” /‘Two Hearts’/ Best Video clip

2004 Annual awards of ‘Nov Folk’ magazine – “Жадувам” /‘I Crave’/ – the best video clip of the year
Annual awards of Melo TV Mania–“Бъди добро момче” /‘Be A Good Boy’/ video clip of the year

2005 Annual awards of ‘Nov Folk’ magazine – Best duo for “Казваш че ме обичаш” /“Say you love me”/
Annual awards of ‘Nov Folk’ magazine – Best clip

2006 ‘Nov Folk’ magazine – Music Video of the year – “Някой ден”/„Some day”/
Annual awards of ‘Bliasuk’ magazine – Body of Bliasuk 
   
2007 ‘FHM’ magazine – The sexiest Bulgarian woman 
Nov Folk Magazine Award for best live performance

2008 Radio Romantica Award for best ballad “Някой ден”/„Some day”/

2009 Nov Folk Magazine Award for song of the decade for “Бели нощи” /„White nights”/ (1998–2008)
Award for successful missions to the Red Cross charity

2011 Radio Romantica Award for Eternal ballad “Забрави за мен” /“Forget about me”/

2012 Radio Romantica Award for Best voice of radio Romantica
Award for Best cover of the magazine “Mr. Big

2013 Radnevo Award – The prize was for the people who have made significant and tangible contributions to the development and prosperity of the town of Radnevo.

Discography 

 "No Problems" – 1998
 "Heads-Tails" – 2000
 "Forever" – 2001
 "Mystery" – 2002
 "Love Is Just A Feeling" – 2004
 "Together" – 2004
 "Hot Trail" – 2005
 "Sweet Dreams" – 2006
 "Listen To Your Heart" – 2009

References

External links
 Official Website

1979 births
Living people
21st-century Bulgarian women singers
Bulgarian pop singers
Bulgarian folk-pop singers
People from Radnevo
Big Brother (Bulgarian TV series) contestants
Spanish-language singers
English-language singers from Bulgaria
Payner artists
Bulgarian pop musicians